Eric Byrne (born 21 April 1947) is a former Irish Labour Party politician who served as a Teachta Dála (TD) for the Dublin South-Central constituency from 1989 to 1992, 1994 to 1997 and 2011 to 2016.

He was formerly a member of Official Sinn Féin, the Workers' Party and Democratic Left.

Born in Dublin, he was educated at Synge Street CBS and the Bolton Street College of Technology. A carpenter before entering politics, Byrne stood unsuccessfully for election to Dáil Éireann as a Workers' Party candidate for Dublin Rathmines West at the 1977 general election and Dublin South-Central at the 1981, February 1982, November 1982 and 1987 general elections.

He was elected in 1985 as a Workers' Party member of Dublin City Council for Crumlin/Kimmage area, and was re-elected at subsequent local elections until 2011, where he was forced to resign his seat due to dual mandate. He was finally elected at the 1989 general election. He joined with Workers' Party members who formed Democratic Left in 1992. He unexpectedly lost his seat at the 1992 general election. Labour's Pat Upton was unexpectedly returned on the first count, with Byrne finally losing the last seat to Fianna Fáil's Ben Briscoe by five votes after a marathon 10-day count.

He was elected to the 27th Dáil at a by-election on 9 June 1994 following the resignation of long-serving Fianna Fáil TD John O'Connell (who had previously been a Labour TD for the same constituency). Byrne was a backbench supporter of the 'Rainbow' government led by Fine Gael's John Bruton.

Byrne lost his seat again at the 1997 general election. Although the Labour Party and the Democratic Left merged in 1999, he was not selected to contest the Dublin South-Central by-election which followed Pat Upton's death later that year. Upton's sister Mary was elected for the Labour Party.

Byrne contested the 2002 general election on the Labour Party ticket as Mary Upton's running-mate, but was unsuccessful. Along with Mary Upton, he contested the Dublin South-Central constituency at the 2007 general election advocating a Labour Party/Fine Gael government but missed the final seat by 69 votes. Byrne was nominated by the Labour Party to contest the Seanad election in the Labour panel but was not elected. In 2009, he was re-elected to Dublin City Council. At the 2011 general election he was re-elected to the Dáil, after 14 years.

In January 2015, he became involved in an altercation with Sinn Féin TD, Jonathan O'Brien. During ministers questions, O'Brien had criticized Tainiste Joan Burton over homelessness in Ireland, citing the experiences of his brother who was a recovering heroin addict. Byrne asked of O'Brien "Why doesn’t his good family give him a home?" which infuriated O'Brien. Irish Times journalist Miriam Lord, criticized Byrne, remarking that "You sense the relief rising in the chamber. They don’t like it when the real world intrudes. These sort of things don’t really happen to TDs."

He lost his seat at the 2016 general election.

References

1947 births
Living people
Alumni of Dublin Institute of Technology
Democratic Left (Ireland) TDs
Labour Party (Ireland) TDs
Local councillors in Dublin (city)
Members of the 26th Dáil
Members of the 27th Dáil
Members of the 31st Dáil
Workers' Party (Ireland) TDs
People educated at Synge Street CBS